South Carolina Highway 129 (SC 129) is a  state highway in the U.S. state of South Carolina. It connects Falling Creek Road near Spartanburg with U.S. Route 29 (US 29) and SC 292 in Lyman. It also has an interchange with Interstate 85 (I-85) just north of its southern terminus. The highway is known as Fort Prince Boulevard.

Route description

History
The route was built c. 1952, around the same time as the original construction of I-85 north of Spartanburg (now mainly Interstate 85 Business). It was bypassed c. 1960 by another piece of I-85.

Major Intersections

See also

References

External links

SC 129 at Virginia Highways' South Carolina Highways Annex

129
Transportation in Spartanburg County, South Carolina